The Agora of Smyrna, alternatively known as the Agora of İzmir, is an ancient Roman agora located in Smyrna (present-day İzmir, Turkey). Originally built by the Greeks in the 4th century BC, the agora was ruined by an earthquake in 178 AD. Roman Emperor Marcus Aurelius ordered its reconstruction. Excavations started in 1933. In 2020, the Agora of Smyrna became a Tentative World Heritage Site as part of "The Historical Port City of Izmir."

Buildings and structures of the agora
Faustina Gate
Ancient Street
North Stoa (Basilica)
West Stoa
Graffiti
Corinthian colonnade
Ottoman-era Muslim graveyard
House of Sabbatai Zevi

References

External links

Ancient Smyrna
Ancient Roman buildings and structures in Turkey
Tourist attractions in İzmir
Konak District
World Heritage Tentative List for Turkey